The Honeywell Center in downtown Wabash, Indiana, United States, is located  southwest of Fort Wayne, Indiana. It's a block-long arts complex featuring the Ford Theater, Clark Gallery, and Eugenia's Restaurant. The Ford Theater presents Broadway, rock, country, classical, and comedy performances.

The Honeywell Center is operated by The Honeywell Foundation, Inc. The foundation was established in 1941 by Wabash native Mark C. Honeywell - a developer of the thermostat and automatic controls for heating systems.

Building of the  Center began in 1940 but was delayed until 1952 due to the shortage of labor and materials needed for World War II. The Center's gymnasium was informally opened November 19, 1947; however, the entire facility was completed in 1952 and included a roller rink and several meeting spaces.

In 1994, a  addition expanded the Honeywell Center to include the 1,500-seat Ford Theater, Eugenia's Restaurant and an art gallery. The Center has 14 rooms, for parties between eight and 1,500 people.

It was listed on the National Register of Historic Places in 1983.

References

External links
 Honeywell Center official site

Commercial buildings on the National Register of Historic Places in Indiana
Buildings and structures completed in 1952
Tourist attractions in Wabash County, Indiana
Convention centers in Indiana
Wabash, Indiana
Buildings and structures in Wabash County, Indiana
National Register of Historic Places in Wabash County, Indiana
Event venues on the National Register of Historic Places in Indiana